A referendum on introducing a compulsory retirement savings scheme was held in New Zealand on 26 September 1997. The question put in the referendum was, "Do you support the proposed compulsory retirement savings scheme?" The proposal was rejected by 91.8% of voters, with a turnout of 80.3%.

The design of the proposed savings scheme and the referendum were a result of the coalition agreement between the National Party and New Zealand First following the 1996 general election. The referendum was set up by the Compulsory Retirement Savings Scheme Referendum Act 1997.

Results

References

New Zealand
Pensions referendum
1997
Pensions referendum
Pension referendums
September 1997 events in New Zealand